Southie may refer to:
 South Boston, a nickname for a predominantly Irish section of Boston, Massachusetts
 Southie (film), a 1999 film

See also
 Southey (disambiguation)
 South (disambiguation)